The Treaty of Versailles was a peace treaty signed on 28 June 1919. As the most important treaty of World War I, it ended the state of war between Germany and most of the Allied Powers. It was signed in the Palace of Versailles, exactly five years after the assassination of Archduke Franz Ferdinand, which led to the war. The other Central Powers on the German side signed separate treaties.  The United States never ratified the Versailles treaty and made a separate peace treaty with Germany.  Although the armistice of 11 November 1918 ended the actual fighting, it took six months of Allied negotiations at the Paris Peace Conference to conclude the peace treaty. Germany was not allowed to participate in the negotiations—it was forced to sign the final result.  

The most critical and controversial provision in the treaty was: "The Allied and Associated Governments affirm and Germany accepts the responsibility of Germany and her allies for causing all the loss and damage to which the Allied and Associated Governments and their nationals have been subjected as a consequence of the war imposed upon them by the aggression of Germany and her allies." The other members of the Central Powers signed treaties containing similar articles. This article, Article 231, became known as the War Guilt clause. The treaty required Germany to disarm, make ample territorial concessions, and pay reparations to certain countries that had formed the Entente powers. In 1921 the total cost of these reparations was assessed at 132 billion gold marks (then $31.4 billion or £6.6 billion, roughly equivalent to US$442 billion or UK£284 billion in ).  Because of the way the deal was structured, the Allied Powers intended Germany would only ever pay a value of 50 billion marks.

Prominent economists such as John Maynard Keynes declared the treaty too harsh—a "Carthaginian peace"—and said the reparations were excessive and counter-productive. On the other hand, prominent Allied figures such as French Marshal Ferdinand Foch, criticized the treaty for treating Germany too leniently. This is still the subject of ongoing debate by historians and economists.

The result of these competing and sometimes conflicting goals among the victors was a compromise that left no one satisfied. In particular, Germany was neither pacified nor conciliated, nor was it permanently weakened. The problems that arose from the treaty would lead to the Locarno Treaties, which improved relations between Germany and the other European powers. The reparation system was reorganized resulting in the Dawes Plan, the Young Plan, and the indefinite postponement of reparations at the Lausanne Conference of 1932. The treaty's terms against Germany resulted in economic collapse and bitter resentment which powered the rise of the Nazi Party, and eventually the outbreak of a second World War.

Although it is often referred to as the "Versailles Conference", only the actual signing of the treaty took place at the historic palace. Most of the negotiations were in Paris, with the "Big Four" meetings taking place generally at the French Ministry of Foreign Affairs on the Quai d'Orsay.

Background

First World War

War broke out unexpectedly following the July Crisis in 1914. Austria-Hungary declared war on Serbia, followed quickly by the entry of most European powers into the First World War. Two alliances faced off, the Central Powers (led by Germany) and the Triple Entente (led by Britain, France and Russia). Other countries entered as fighting raged widely across Europe, as well as the Middle East, Africa and Asia. In 1917, the new Russian Soviet Federative Socialist Republic under Vladimir Lenin in March 1918 signed the Treaty of Brest-Litovsk, amounting to a surrender that was highly favourable to Germany. Sensing victory before the American Expeditionary Forces could be ready, Germany now shifted forces to the Western Front and tried to overwhelm the Allies. It failed. Instead, the Allies won decisively on the battlefield and forced an armistice in November 1918 that resembled a surrender.

US shapes the peace terms with the Fourteen Points

The United States entered the war against the Central Powers in 1917 and President Woodrow Wilson largely shaped the peace terms. His war aim was to detach the war from nationalistic disputes and ambitions. On 8 January 1918, Wilson issued the Fourteen Points. They outlined a policy of free trade, open agreements, and democracy. While the term was not used, self-determination was assumed. It called for a negotiated end to the war, international disarmament, the withdrawal of the Central Powers from occupied territories, the creation of a Polish state, the redrawing of Europe's borders along ethnic lines, and the formation of a League of Nations to guarantee the political independence and territorial integrity of all states.
It called for a just and democratic peace uncompromised by territorial annexation. The Fourteen Points were based on the research of the Inquiry, a team of about 150 advisors led by foreign-policy advisor Edward M. House, into the topics likely to arise in the expected peace conference.

Armistice

During the autumn of 1918, the Central Powers began to collapse.
Desertion rates within the German army began to increase, and civilian strikes drastically reduced war production.
On the Western Front, the Allied forces launched the Hundred Days Offensive and decisively defeated the German western armies.
Sailors of the Imperial German Navy at Kiel mutinied, which prompted uprisings in Germany, which became known as the German Revolution.
The German government tried to obtain a peace settlement based on the Fourteen Points, and maintained it was on this basis that they surrendered. Following negotiations, the Allied powers and Germany signed an armistice, which came into effect on 11 November while German forces were still positioned in France and Belgium.

Occupation

The terms of the armistice called for an immediate evacuation of German troops from occupied Belgium, France, and Luxembourg within fifteen days.
In addition, it established that Allied forces would occupy the Rhineland. In late 1918, Allied troops entered Germany and began the occupation.

Blockade

Both Germany and Great Britain were dependent on imports of food and raw materials, most of which had to be shipped across the Atlantic Ocean. The Blockade of Germany (1914–1919) was a naval operation conducted by the Allied Powers to stop the supply of raw materials and foodstuffs reaching the Central Powers. The German  was mainly restricted to the German Bight and used commerce raiders and unrestricted submarine warfare for a counter-blockade. The German Board of Public Health in December 1918 stated that  civilians had died during the Allied blockade, although an academic study in 1928 put the death toll at 

The blockade was maintained for eight months after the Armistice in November 1918, into the following year of 1919. Foodstuffs imports into Germany were controlled by the Allies after the Armistice with Germany until Germany signed the Treaty of Versailles in June 1919. In March 1919, Churchill informed the House of Commons, that the ongoing blockade was a success and "Germany is very near starvation." From January 1919 to March 1919, Germany refused to agree to Allied demands that Germany surrender its merchant ships to Allied ports to transport food supplies. Some Germans considered the armistice to be a temporary cessation of the war and knew, if fighting broke out again, their ships would be seized. Over the winter of 1919, the situation became desperate and Germany finally agreed to surrender its fleet in March. The Allies then allowed for the import of 270,000 tons of foodstuffs.

Both German and non-German observers have argued that these were the most devastating months of the blockade for German civilians, though disagreement persists as to the extent and who is truly at fault. According to Dr. Max Rubner 100,000 German civilians died due to the continuation blockade after the armistice. In the UK, Labour Party member and anti-war activist Robert Smillie issued a statement in June 1919 condemning continuation of the blockade, claiming 100,000 German civilians had died as a result.

Negotiations

Initially, 70 delegates from 27 nations participated in the negotiations. Russia was excluded due to their signing of a separate peace (the Treaty of Brest-Litovsk) and early withdrawal from the war. Furthermore, German negotiators were excluded to deny them an opportunity to divide the Allies diplomatically.

Initially, a "Council of Ten" (comprising two delegates each from Britain, France, the United States, Italy, and Japan) met officially to decide the peace terms. This council was replaced by the "Council of Five", formed from each country's foreign ministers, to discuss minor matters. French Prime Minister Georges Clemenceau, Italian Prime Minister Vittorio Emanuele Orlando, British Prime Minister David Lloyd George, and United States President Woodrow Wilson formed the "Big Four" (at one point becoming the "Big Three" following the temporary withdrawal of Orlando). These four men met in 145 closed sessions to make all the major decisions, which were later ratified by the entire assembly. The minor powers attended a weekly "Plenary Conference" that discussed issues in a general forum but made no decisions. These members formed over 50 commissions that made various recommendations, many of which were incorporated into the final text of the treaty.

French aims
France had lost 1.3 million soldiers, including  French men aged   France had also been more physically damaged than any other nation (the so-called zone rouge (Red Zone); the most industrialized region and the source of most coal and iron ore in the north-east had been devastated and in the final days of the war mines had been flooded and railways, bridges and factories destroyed.)
Clemenceau intended to ensure the security of France, by weakening Germany economically, militarily, territorially and by supplanting Germany as the leading producer of steel in Europe.
British economist and Versailles negotiator John Maynard Keynes summarized this position as attempting to "set the clock back and undo what, since 1870, the progress of Germany had accomplished."

Clemenceau told Wilson: "America is far away, protected by the ocean. Not even Napoleon himself could touch England. You are both sheltered; we are not".
The French wanted a frontier on the Rhine, to protect France from a German invasion and compensate for French demographic and economic inferiority.
American and British representatives refused the French claim and after two months of negotiations, the French accepted a British pledge to provide an immediate alliance with France if Germany attacked again, and Wilson agreed to put a similar proposal to the Senate. Clemenceau had told the Chamber of Deputies, in December 1918, that his goal was to maintain an alliance with both countries. Clemenceau accepted the offer, in return for an occupation of the Rhineland for fifteen years and that Germany would also demilitarise the Rhineland.

French negotiators required reparations, to make Germany pay for the destruction induced throughout the war and to decrease German strength. The French also wanted the iron ore and coal of the Saar Valley, by annexation to France.
The French were willing to accept a smaller amount of World War I reparations than the Americans would concede and Clemenceau was willing to discuss German capacity to pay with the German delegation, before the final settlement was drafted. In April and May 1919, the French and Germans held separate talks, on mutually acceptable arrangements on issues like reparation, reconstruction and industrial collaboration. France, along with the British Dominions and Belgium, opposed League of Nations mandates and favored annexation of former German colonies.

British aims

Britain had suffered heavy financial costs but suffered little physical devastation during the war,. British public opinion wanted to make Germany pay for the War.
Public opinion favoured a "just peace", which would force Germany to pay reparations and be unable to repeat the aggression of 1914, although those of a "liberal and advanced opinion" shared Wilson's ideal of a peace of reconciliation.

In private Lloyd George opposed revenge and attempted to compromise between Clemenceau's demands and the Fourteen Points, because Europe would eventually have to reconcile with Germany. 
Lloyd George wanted terms of reparation that would not cripple the German economy, so that Germany would remain a viable economic power and trading partner. By arguing that British war pensions and widows' allowances should be included in the German reparation sum, Lloyd George ensured that a large amount would go to the British Empire.

Lloyd George also intended to maintain a European balance of power to thwart a French attempt to establish itself as the dominant European power. A revived Germany would be a counterweight to France and a deterrent to Bolshevik Russia. Lloyd George also wanted to neutralize the German navy to keep the Royal Navy as the greatest naval power in the world; dismantle the German colonial empire with several of its territorial possessions ceded to Britain and others being established as League of Nations mandates, a position opposed by the Dominions.

American aims
Before the American entry into the war, Wilson had talked of a "peace without victory". This position fluctuated following the US entry into the war. Wilson spoke of the German aggressors, with whom there could be no compromised peace.
On 8 January 1918, however, Wilson delivered a speech (known as the Fourteen Points) that declared the American peace objectives: the rebuilding of the European economy, self-determination of European and Middle Eastern ethnic groups, the promotion of free trade, the creation of appropriate mandates for former colonies, and above all, the creation of a powerful League of Nations that would ensure the peace. The aim of the latter was to provide a forum to revise the peace treaties as needed, and deal with problems that arose as a result of the peace and the rise of new states.

Wilson brought along top intellectuals as advisors to the American peace delegation, and the overall American position echoed the Fourteen Points. Wilson firmly opposed harsh treatment on Germany. While the British and French wanted to largely annex the German colonial empire, Wilson saw that as a violation of the fundamental principles of justice and human rights of the native populations, and favored them having the right of self-determination via the creation of mandates. The promoted idea called for the major powers to act as disinterested trustees over a region, aiding the native populations until they could govern themselves.
In spite of this position and in order to ensure that Japan did not refuse to join the League of Nations, Wilson favored turning over the former German colony of Shandong, in Eastern China, to the Japanese Empire rather than return the area to the Republic of China's control.
Further confounding the Americans, was US internal partisan politics. In November 1918, the Republican Party won the Senate election by a slim margin. Wilson, a Democrat, refused to include prominent Republicans in the American delegation making his efforts seem partisan, and contributed to a risk of political defeat at home.

Italian aims
Vittorio Emanuele Orlando and his foreign minister Sidney Sonnino, an Anglican of British origins, worked primarily to secure the partition of the Habsburg Empire and their attitude towards Germany was not as hostile. Generally speaking, Sonnino was in line with the British position while Orlando favored a compromise between Clemenceau and Wilson. Within the negotiations for the Treaty of Versailles, Orlando obtained certain results such as the permanent membership of Italy in the security council of the League of Nations and a promised transfer of British Jubaland and French Aozou strip to the Italian colonies of Somalia and Libya respectively. Italian nationalists, however, saw the War as a "mutilated victory" for what they considered to be little territorial gains achieved in the other treaties directly impacting Italy's borders. Orlando was ultimately forced to abandon the conference and resign. Orlando refused to see World War I as a mutilated victory, replying at nationalists calling for a greater expansion that "Italy today is a great state....on par with the great historic and contemporary states. This is, for me, our main and principal expansion." Francesco Saverio Nitti took Orlando's place in signing the treaty of Versailles.

Treaty content and signing

In June 1919, the Allies declared that war would resume if the German government did not sign the treaty they had agreed to among themselves. The government headed by Philipp Scheidemann was unable to agree on a common position, and Scheidemann himself resigned rather than agree to sign the treaty. Gustav Bauer, the head of the new government, sent a telegram stating his intention to sign the treaty if certain articles were withdrawn, including Articles 227, 230 and 231. In response, the Allies issued an ultimatum stating that Germany would have to accept the treaty or face an invasion of Allied forces across the Rhine within  On 23 June, Bauer capitulated and sent a second telegram with a confirmation that a German delegation would arrive shortly to sign the treaty.
On 28 June 1919, the fifth anniversary of the assassination of Archduke Franz Ferdinand (the immediate impetus for the war), the peace treaty was signed. The treaty had clauses ranging from war crimes, the prohibition on the merging of the Republic of German Austria with Germany without the consent of the League of Nations, freedom of navigation on major European rivers, to the returning of a Koran to the king of Hedjaz.

Territorial changes

It also required Germany to give up the gains made via the Treaty of Brest-Litovsk and grant independence to the protectorates that had been established.
In Western Europe, Germany was required to recognize Belgian sovereignty over Moresnet and cede control of the Eupen-Malmedy area. Within six months of the transfer, Belgium was required to conduct a plebiscite on whether the citizens of the region wanted to remain under Belgian sovereignty or return to German control, communicate the results to the League of Nations and abide by the League's decision.
To compensate for the destruction of French coal mines, Germany was to cede the output of the Saar coalmines to France and control of the Saar to the League of Nations for 15 years; a plebiscite would then be held to decide sovereignty.
The treaty restored the provinces of Alsace-Lorraine to France by rescinding the treaties of Versailles and Frankfurt of 1871 as they pertained to this issue.
France was able to make the claim that the provinces of Alsace-Lorraine were indeed part of France and not part of Germany by disclosing a letter sent from the Prussian King to the Empress Eugénie that Eugénie provided, in which William I wrote that the territories of Alsace-Lorraine were requested by Germany for the sole purpose of national defense and not to expand the German territory. The sovereignty of Schleswig-Holstein was to be resolved by a plebiscite to be held at a future time (see Schleswig Plebiscites).

In Central Europe Germany was to recognize the independence of Czechoslovakia (which had actually been controlled by Austria) and cede parts of the province of Upper Silesia.
Germany had to recognize the independence of Poland and renounce "all rights and title over the territory". Portions of Upper Silesia were to be ceded to Poland, with the future of the rest of the province to be decided by plebiscite. The border would be fixed with regard to the vote and to the geographical and economic conditions of each locality.
The Province of Posen (now Poznań), which had come under Polish control during the Greater Poland Uprising, was also to be ceded to Poland.
Pomerelia (Eastern Pomerania), on historical and ethnic grounds, was transferred to Poland so that the new state could have access to the sea and became known as the Polish Corridor.
The sovereignty of part of southern East Prussia was to be decided via plebiscite while the East Prussian Soldau area, which was astride the rail line between Warsaw and Danzig, was transferred to Poland outright without plebiscite.
Memel was to be ceded to the Allied and Associated powers, for disposal according to their wishes.
Germany was to cede the city of Danzig and its hinterland, including the delta of the Vistula River on the Baltic Sea, for the League of Nations to establish the Free City of Danzig.

Mandates

Article 119 of the treaty required Germany to renounce sovereignty over former colonies and Article 22 converted the territories into League of Nations mandates under the control of Allied states. Togoland and German Kamerun (Cameroon) were transferred to France, aside from portions given to Britain, British Togoland and British Cameroon. Ruanda and Urundi were allocated to Belgium, whereas German South-West Africa went to South Africa and Britain obtained German East Africa. As compensation for the German invasion of Portuguese Africa, Portugal was granted the Kionga Triangle, a sliver of German East Africa in northern Mozambique.
Article 156 of the treaty transferred German concessions in Shandong, China, to Japan, not to China. Japan was granted all German possessions in the Pacific north of the equator and those south of the equator went to Australia, except for German Samoa, which was taken by New Zealand.

Military restrictions
The treaty was comprehensive and complex in the restrictions imposed upon the post-war German armed forces (the ). The provisions were intended to make the  incapable of offensive action and to encourage international disarmament.
The treaty laid down the organisation of the divisions and support units, and the General Staff was to be dissolved.
Military schools for officer training were limited to three, one school per arm, and conscription was abolished. To prevent Germany from building up a large cadre of trained men, the number of men allowed to leave early was limited.

The number of civilian staff supporting the army was reduced and the police force was reduced to its pre-war size, with increases limited to population increases; paramilitary forces were forbidden.
Military structures and fortifications on the islands of Heligoland and Düne were to be destroyed.
Germany was prohibited from the arms trade, limits were imposed on the type and quantity of weapons and prohibited from the manufacture or stockpile of chemical weapons, armoured cars, tanks and military aircraft.
The German navy was allowed six pre-dreadnought battleships and was limited to a maximum of six light cruisers (not exceeding ), twelve destroyers (not exceeding ) and twelve torpedo boats (not exceeding ) and was forbidden submarines.
The manpower of the navy was not to exceed  including manning for the fleet, coast defences, signal stations, administration, other land services, officers and men of all grades and corps. The number of officers and warrant officers was not allowed to exceed 
Germany surrendered eight battleships, eight light cruisers, forty-two destroyers, and fifty torpedo boats for decommissioning. Thirty-two auxiliary ships were to be disarmed and converted to merchant use.
Article 198 prohibited Germany from having an air force, including naval air forces, and required Germany to hand over all aerial related materials. In conjunction, Germany was forbidden to manufacture or import aircraft or related material for a period of six months following the signing of the treaty.

Reparations

In Article 231 Germany accepted responsibility for the losses and damages caused by the war "as a consequence of the ... aggression of Germany and her allies." The treaty required Germany to compensate the Allied powers, and it also established an Allied "Reparation Commission" to determine the exact amount which Germany would pay and the form that such payment would take. In the interim, the treaty required Germany to pay an equivalent of 20 billion gold marks ($5 billion) in gold, commodities, ships, securities or other forms. The money would help to pay for Allied occupation costs and buy food and raw materials for Germany.

Guarantees

To ensure compliance, the Rhineland and bridgeheads east of the Rhine were to be occupied by Allied troops for fifteen years.
If Germany had not committed aggression, a staged withdrawal would take place; after five years, the Cologne bridgehead and the territory north of a line along the Ruhr would be evacuated. After ten years, the bridgehead at Coblenz and the territories to the north would be evacuated and after fifteen years remaining Allied forces would be withdrawn.
If Germany reneged on the treaty obligations, the bridgeheads would be reoccupied immediately.

International organizations

Part I of the treaty, in common with all the treaties signed during the Paris Peace Conference, was the Covenant of the League of Nations, which provided for the creation of the League, an organization for the arbitration of international disputes.
Part XIII organized the establishment of the International Labour Office, to regulate hours of work, including a maximum working day and week; the regulation of the labour supply; the prevention of unemployment; the provision of a living wage; the protection of the worker against sickness, disease and injury arising out of his employment; the protection of children, young persons and women; provision for old age and injury; protection of the interests of workers when employed abroad; recognition of the principle of freedom of association; the organization of vocational and technical education and other measures.
The treaty also called for the signatories to sign or ratify the International Opium Convention.

Reactions

Britain

The delegates of the Commonwealth and British Government had mixed thoughts on the treaty, with some seeing the French policy as being greedy and vindictive. Lloyd George and his private secretary Philip Kerr believed in the treaty, although they also felt that the French would keep Europe in a constant state of turmoil by attempting to enforce the treaty. Delegate Harold Nicolson wrote "are we making a good peace?", while General Jan Smuts (a member of the South African delegation) wrote to Lloyd-George, before the signing, that the treaty was unstable and declared "Are we in our sober senses or suffering from shellshock? What has become of Wilson's 14 points?" He wanted the Germans not be made to sign at the "point of the bayonet".
Smuts issued a statement condemning the treaty and regretting that the promises of "a new international order and a fairer, better world are not written in this treaty". Lord Robert Cecil said that many within the Foreign Office were disappointed by the treaty. The treaty received widespread approval from the general public. Bernadotte Schmitt wrote that the "average Englishman ... thought Germany got only what it deserved" as a result of the treaty, but public opinion changed as German complaints mounted.

Former wartime British Prime Minister H. H. Asquith and the Independent Liberal opposition in the British Parliament after the 1918 general election believed the treaty was too punitive. Asquith campaigned against it while running for another House of Commons seat in the 1920 Paisley by-election.

Prime Minister Ramsay MacDonald, following the German re-militarisation of the Rhineland in 1936, stated that he was "pleased" that the treaty was "vanishing", expressing his hope that the French had been taught a "severe lesson".

Status of British Dominions 
The Treaty of Versailles was an important step in the status of the British Dominions under international law. Australia, Canada, New Zealand and South Africa had each made significant contributions to the British war effort, but as separate countries, rather than as British colonies. India also made a substantial troop contribution, although under direct British control, unlike the Dominions. The four Dominions and India all signed the Treaty separately from Britain, a clear recognition by the international community that the Dominions were no longer British colonies. "Their status defied exact analysis by both international and constitutional lawyers, but it was clear that they were no longer regarded simply as colonies of Britain." By signing the Treaty individually, the four Dominions and India also were founding members of the League of Nations in their own right, rather than simply as part of the British Empire.

France
The signing of the treaty was met with roars of approval, singing, and dancing from a crowd outside the Palace of Versailles. In Paris proper, people rejoiced at the official end of the war,
the return of Alsace and Lorraine to France, and that Germany had agreed to pay reparations.

While France ratified the treaty and was active in the League, the jubilant mood soon gave way to a political backlash for Clemenceau. The French Right saw the treaty as being too lenient and saw it as failing to achieve all of France's demands. Left-wing politicians attacked the treaty and Clemenceau for being too harsh (the latter turning into a ritual condemnation of the treaty, for politicians remarking on French foreign affairs, as late as August 1939). Marshal Ferdinand Foch stated "this (treaty) is not peace. It is an armistice for twenty years."; a criticism over the failure to annex the Rhineland and for compromising French security for the benefit of the United States and Britain. When Clemenceau stood for election as President of France in January 1920, he was defeated.

Italy
Reaction in the Kingdom of Italy to the treaty was extremely negative. The country had suffered high casualties, yet failed to achieve most of its major war goals, notably gaining control of the Dalmatian coast and Fiume. President Wilson rejected Italy's claims on the basis of "national self-determination." For their part, Britain and France—who had been forced in the war's latter stages to divert their own troops to the Italian front to stave off collapse—were disinclined to support Italy's position at the peace conference. Differences in negotiating strategy between Premier Vittorio Orlando and Foreign Minister Sidney Sonnino further undermined Italy's position at the conference. A furious Vittorio Orlando suffered a nervous collapse and at one point walked out of the conference (though he later returned). He lost his position as prime minister just a week before the treaty was scheduled to be signed, effectively ending his active political career. Anger and dismay over the treaty's provisions helped pave the way for the establishment of Benito Mussolini's Fascist dictatorship three years later.

Portugal
Portugal entered the war on the Allied side in 1916 primarily to ensure the security of its African colonies, which were threatened with seizure by both Britain and Germany. To this extent, she succeeded in her war aims. The treaty recognized Portuguese sovereignty over these areas and awarded her small portions of Germany's bordering overseas colonies. Otherwise, Portugal gained little at the peace conference. Her promised share of German reparations never materialized, and a seat she coveted on the executive council of the new League of Nations went instead to Spain—which had remained neutral in the war. In the end, Portugal ratified the treaty, but got little out of the war, which cost more than 8,000 Portuguese Armed Forces troops and as many as 100,000 of her African colonial subjects their lives.

United States
 After the Versailles conference, Democratic President Woodrow Wilson claimed that "at last the world knows America as the savior of the world!"
But the Republican Party, led by Henry Cabot Lodge, controlled the United States Senate after the election of 1918, and the senators were divided into multiple positions on the Versailles question. It proved possible to build a majority coalition, but impossible to build a two-thirds coalition that was needed to pass a treaty.

A discontent bloc of 12–18 "Irreconcilables", mostly Republicans but also representatives of the Irish and German Democrats, fiercely opposed the treaty. One bloc of Democrats strongly supported the Versailles Treaty, even with reservations added by Lodge. A second group of Democrats supported the treaty but followed Wilson in opposing any amendments or reservations. The largest bloc, led by Senator Lodge, comprised a majority of the Republicans. They wanted a treaty with reservations, especially on Article 10, which involved the power of the League of Nations to make war without a vote by the US Congress. All of the Irreconcilables were bitter enemies of President Wilson, and he launched a nationwide speaking tour in the summer of 1919 to refute them. But Wilson collapsed midway with a serious stroke that effectively ruined his leadership skills.

The closest the treaty came to passage was on 19 November 1919, as Lodge and his Republicans formed a coalition with the pro-treaty Democrats, and were close to a two-thirds majority for a Treaty with reservations, but Wilson rejected this compromise and enough Democrats followed his lead to end the chances of ratification permanently. Among the American public as a whole, the Irish Catholics and the German Americans were intensely opposed to the treaty, saying it favored the British.

After Wilson's presidency, his successor Republican President Warren G. Harding continued American opposition to the formation of the League of Nations. Congress subsequently passed the Knox–Porter Resolution bringing a formal end to hostilities between the United States and the Central Powers. It was signed into law by President Harding on 2 July 1921. Soon after, the US–German Peace Treaty of 1921 was signed in Berlin on 25 August 1921, and two similar treaties were signed with Austria and Hungary on 24 and 29 August 1921, in Vienna and Budapest respectively.

Edward House's views
Wilson's former friend Edward Mandell House, present at the negotiations, wrote in his diary on 29 June 1919:

I am leaving Paris, after eight fateful months, with conflicting emotions. Looking at the conference in retrospect, there is much to approve and yet much to regret. It is easy to say what should have been done, but more difficult to have found a way of doing it. To those who are saying that the treaty is bad and should never have been made and that it will involve Europe in infinite difficulties in its enforcement, I feel like admitting it. But I would also say in reply that empires cannot be shattered, and new states raised upon their ruins without disturbance. To create new boundaries is to create new troubles. The one follows the other. While I should have preferred a different peace, I doubt very much whether it could have been made, for the ingredients required for such a peace as I would have were lacking at Paris.

China
Many in China felt betrayed as the German territory in China was handed to Japan. Wellington Koo refused to sign the treaty and the Chinese delegation at the Paris Peace Conference was the only nation that did not sign the Treaty of Versailles at the signing ceremony. The sense of betrayal led to great demonstrations in China such as the May 4th movement. There was immense dissatisfaction with Duan Qirui's government, which had secretly negotiated with the Japanese in order to secure loans to fund their military campaigns against the south. On 12 June 1919, the Chinese cabinet was forced to resign and the government instructed its delegation at Versailles not to sign the treaty. As a result, relations with the Western world deteriorated.

Germany

On 29 April, the German delegation under the leadership of the Foreign Minister Ulrich Graf von Brockdorff-Rantzau arrived in Versailles. On 7 May, when faced with the conditions dictated by the victors, including the so-called "War Guilt Clause", von Brockdorff-Rantzau replied to Clemenceau, Wilson and Lloyd George: "We can sense the full force of hatred that confronts us here. ... You demand from us to confess we were the only guilty party of war; such a confession in my mouth would be a lie."
Because Germany was not allowed to take part in the negotiations, the German government issued a protest against what it considered to be unfair demands, and a "violation of honour", soon afterwards withdrawing from the proceedings of the peace conference.

Germans of all political shades denounced the treaty—particularly the War Guilt Clause that blamed Germany for starting the war—as an insult to the nation's honour. They referred to the treaty as "the Diktat" since its terms were presented to Germany on a take-it-or-leave-it basis. Germany's first democratically elected head of government, Philipp Scheidemann, resigned rather than sign the treaty. In an emotional and polemical address to the Weimar National Assembly on 12 May 1919, he called the treaty a "horrific and murderous witch's hammer", and exclaimed:  At the end of his speech, Scheidemann stated that, in the government's opinion, the treaty was unacceptable.

After Scheidemann's resignation, a new coalition government was formed under Gustav Bauer. President Friedrich Ebert knew that Germany was in an impossible situation. Although he shared his countrymen's disgust with the treaty, he was sober enough to consider the possibility that the government would not be in a position to reject it. He believed that if Germany refused to sign the treaty, the Allies would invade Germany from the west—and there was no guarantee that the army would be able to make a stand in the event of an invasion. With this in mind, he asked Field Marshal Paul von Hindenburg if the army was capable of any meaningful resistance in the event the Allies resumed the war. If there was even the slightest chance that the army could hold out, Ebert intended to recommend against ratifying the treaty. Hindenburg—after prodding from his chief of staff, Wilhelm Groener—concluded the army could not resume the war even on a limited scale. But rather than inform Ebert himself, he had Groener inform the government that the army would be in an untenable position in the event of renewed hostilities. Upon receiving this, the new government recommended signing the treaty. The National Assembly voted in favour of signing the treaty by 237 to 138, with five abstentions (there were 421 delegates in total). This result was wired to Clemenceau just hours before the deadline. Foreign minister Hermann Müller and colonial minister Johannes Bell travelled to Versailles to sign the treaty on behalf of Germany. The treaty was signed on 28 June 1919 and ratified by the National Assembly on 9 July by a vote of 209 to 116.

Japan

The disenfranchised and often colonized "non-white" world held high expectations that a new order would open up an unheralded opportunity to have a principle of racial equality recognized by the leading global powers. Japanese diplomacy had bitter memories of the rhetoric of the Yellow Peril, and the arrogance, underwritten by the assumptions about a White Man's Burden, memories aggravated by the rise of racial discrimination against their business men, severe immigration restrictions on Asiatics, and court judgments hostile to Japanese interests, which characterized Western states' treatment of their nationals. Japan's delegation, among whose plenipotentiaries figured Baron Makino and Ambassador Chinda Sutemi, was led by its elder statesman Saionji Kinmochi.

Versailles represented a chance to overturn this imposed inferiority, whose tensions were strengthened particularly in Japan's relationship with the United States during WW1. Confidence in their growing industrial strength, and conquest of Germany's Far East possessions, together with their proven fidelity to the Entente would, it was thought, allow them finally to take their rightful place among the victorious Great Powers. They solicited support especially from the American delegation to obtain recognition for the principle of racial equality at the League of Nations Commission. Their proposals to this end were consistently rebuffed by British, French, American and Australian diplomats, who were all sensitive to their respective countries' internal pressures. Wilson himself was an enactor of segregationist policies in the United States, Clemenceau openly ridiculed them, Arthur Balfour considered Africans inferior to Europeans – equality was only true of people within particular nations – while William Hughes, adopting a "slap the Jap" attitude, was a vocal defender of a White Australia policy.

Japan's attempt, buttressed by the Chinese emissary Wellington Koo among others, to incorporate a Racial Equality Proposal in the treaty, had broad support, but was effectively declined when it was rejected by the United States, Great Britain and Australia, despite a powerfully persuasive speech delivered by Makino.

Japan itself both prior to and during WW1 had embarked on a vigorous expansion of continental colonialism, whose aims were justified in terms of an ideological vision of Asians, such as Koreans and Chinese, being of the same culture and race, though its vision of those countries was paternalistic and geared to subordinating them to Japan's interests. Aspiring to be accepted as a world actor with similar status to the traditional Western powers, Japan envisaged an Asian Monroe Doctrine, where Japan's proper sphere of geostrategic interests in Asia would be recognized. Some years earlier, Japan secured both British and French support for its claims to inherit rights that Germany had exercised both in China and in the Pacific Ocean north of the Equator. American policy experts, unaware of these secret agreements, nonetheless suggested that Japan had adopted a Prussian model that would imperil China's own search for autonomy, and these considerations influenced Wilson.

Implementation

Reparations

On 5 May 1921, the reparation Commission established the London Schedule of Payments and a final reparation sum of 132 billion gold marks to be demanded of all the Central Powers. This was the public assessment of what the Central Powers combined could pay, and was also a compromise between Belgian, British, and French demands and assessments. Furthermore, the Commission recognized that the Central Powers could pay little and that the burden would fall upon Germany. As a result, the sum was split into different categories, of which Germany was only required to pay 50 billion gold marks ( billion); this being the genuine assessment of the commission on what Germany could pay, and allowed the Allied powers to save face with the public by presenting a higher figure. Furthermore, payments made between 1919 and 1921 were taken into account reducing the sum to 41 billion gold marks.

In order to meet this sum, Germany could pay in cash or kind: coal, timber, chemical dyes, pharmaceuticals, livestock, agricultural machines, construction materials, and factory machinery. Germany's assistance with the restoration of the university library of Leuven, which was destroyed by the Germans on 25 August 1914, was also credited towards the sum. Territorial changes imposed by the treaty were also factored in. The payment schedule required  million within twenty-five days and then  million annually, plus 26 per cent of the value of German exports. The German Government was to issue bonds at five per cent interest and set up a sinking fund of one per cent to support the payment of reparations.

Territorial changes

In February and March 1920, the Schleswig Plebiscites were held. The people of Schleswig were presented with only two choices: Danish or German sovereignty. The northern Danish-speaking area voted for Denmark while the southern German-speaking area voted for Germany, resulting in the province being partitioned. The East Prussia plebiscite was held on 11 July 1920. There was a  out with  the population wishing to remain with Germany. Further plebiscites were held in Eupen-Malmedy and Neutral Moresnet. On 20 September 1920, the League of Nations allotted these territories to Belgium. These latter plebiscites were followed by a boundary commission in 1922, followed by the new Belgian-German border being recognized by the German Government on 15 December 1923.
The transfer of the Hultschin area, of Silesia, to Czechoslovakia was completed on 3 February 1921.

Following the implementation of the treaty, Upper Silesia was initially governed by Britain, France, and Italy. Between 1919 and 1921, three major outbreaks of violence took place between German and Polish civilians, resulting in German and Polish military forces also becoming involved.
In March 1921, the Inter-Allied Commission held the Upper Silesia plebiscite, which was peaceful despite the previous violence. The plebiscite resulted in  the population voting for the province to remain part of Germany.
Following the vote, the League of Nations debated the future of the province.
In 1922, Upper Silesia was partitioned: Oppeln, in the north-west, remained with Germany while Silesia Province, in the south-east, was transferred to Poland.

Memel remained under the authority of the League of Nations, with a French Armed Forces garrison, until January 1923.
On 9 January 1923, the Lithuanian Army invaded the territory during the Klaipėda Revolt.
The French garrison withdrew, and in February the Allies agreed to attach Memel as an "autonomous territory" to Lithuania. On 8 May 1924, after negotiations between the Lithuanian Government and the Conference of Ambassadors and action by the League of Nations, the annexation of Memel was ratified. Lithuania accepted the Memel Statute, a power-sharing arrangement to protect non-Lithuanians in the territory and its autonomous status while responsibility for the territory remained with the great powers. The League of Nations mediated between the Germans and Lithuanians on a local level, helping the power-sharing arrangement last until 1939.

The region returned to German sovereignty on 1 March 1935. When the result was announced  including  from Germany fled to France.

Rhineland occupation

In late 1918, American, Belgian, British, and French troops entered the Rhineland to enforce the armistice. Before the treaty, the occupation force stood at roughly 740,000 men. Following the signing of the peace treaty, the numbers drastically decreased and by 1926 the occupation force numbered only 76,000 men.
As part of the 1929 negotiations that would become the Young Plan, Gustav Stresemann, and Aristide Briand negotiated the early withdrawal of Allied forces from the Rhineland.
On 30 June 1930, after speeches and the lowering of flags, the last troops of the Anglo-French-Belgian occupation force withdrew from Germany.

Belgium maintained an occupation force of roughly 10,000 troops throughout the initial years.
This figure fell to 7,102 by 1926, and continued to fall as a result of diplomatic developments.

The British Second Army, with some 275,000 veteran soldiers, entered Germany in late 1918. In March 1919, this force became the British Army of the Rhine (BAOR). The total number of troops committed to the occupation rapidly dwindled as veteran soldiers were demobilized, and were replaced by inexperienced men who had finished basic training following the cessation of hostilities.
By 1920, the BAOR consisted of only 40,594 men and the following year had been further reduced to 12,421. The size of the BAOR fluctuated over the following years, but never rose above 9,000 men. The British did not adhere to all obligated territorial withdrawals as dictated by Versailles, on account of Germany not meeting her own treaty obligations.
A complete withdrawal was considered, but rejected in order to maintain a presence to continue acting as a check on French ambitions and prevent the establishment of an autonomous Rhineland Republic.

The French Army of the Rhine was initially 250,000 men strong, including at a peak 40,000 African colonial troops. By 1923, the French occupation force had decreased to roughly 130,000 men, including 27,126 African troops.
The troop numbers peaked again at 250,000 during the occupation of the Ruhr, before decreasing to 60,000 men by 1926. Germans viewed the use of French colonial troops as a deliberate act of humiliation, and used their presence to create a propaganda campaign dubbed the Black shame. This campaign lasted throughout the 1920s and 30s, although peaked in 1920 and 1921. For example, a 1921 German Government memo detailed 300 acts of violence from colonial troops, which included 65 murders and 170 sexual offenses. Historical consensus is that the charges were exaggerated for political and propaganda purposes, and that the colonial troops behaved far better than their white counterparts. An estimated 500–800 Rhineland Bastards were born as a result of fraternization between colonial troops and German women, and who would later be persecuted.

On 7 January 1923, after the Franco–Belgian occupation of the Ruhr, the US senate legislated the withdrawal of the remaining force.
On 24 January, the American garrison started their withdrawal from the Rhineland, with the final troops leaving in early February.

Violations

Reparations

In March 1921, French and Belgian troops occupied Duisburg, Düsseldorf, and other areas which formed part of the demilitarized Rhineland, according to the Treaty of Versailles. In January 1923, French and Belgian forces occupied the rest of the Ruhr area as a reprisal after Germany failed to fulfill reparation payments demanded by the Versailles Treaty. The German government answered with "passive resistance", which meant that coal miners and railway workers refused to obey any instructions by the occupation forces. Production and transportation came to a standstill, but the financial consequences contributed to German hyperinflation and completely ruined public finances in Germany. Consequently, passive resistance was called off in late 1923. The end of passive resistance in the Ruhr allowed Germany to undertake a currency reform and to negotiate the Dawes Plan, which led to the withdrawal of French and Belgian troops from the Ruhr Area in 1925.

Military
In 1920, the head of the  Hans von Seeckt clandestinely re-established the General Staff, by expanding the Truppenamt (Troop Office); purportedly a human resources section of the army. In March,  German troops entered the Rhineland under the guise of attempting to quell possible unrest by the Communist Party of Germany and in doing so violated the demilitarized zone. In response, French troops advanced further into Germany until the German troops withdrew.

German officials conspired systematically to evade the clauses of the treaty, by failing to meet disarmament deadlines, refusing Allied officials access to military facilities, and maintaining and hiding weapon production. As the treaty did not ban German companies from producing war material outside of Germany, companies moved to the Netherlands, Switzerland, and Sweden. Bofors was bought by Krupp, and in 1921 German troops were sent to Sweden to test weapons.
The establishment of diplomatic ties with the Soviet Union, via the Genoa Conference and Treaty of Rapallo, was also used to circumvent the Treaty of Versailles. Publicly, these diplomatic exchanges were largely in regards to trade and future economic cooperation. But secret military clauses were included that allowed for Germany to develop weapons inside the Soviet Union. Furthermore, it allowed for Germany to establish three training areas for aviation, chemical and tank warfare.

The Weimar Government also funded domestic rearmament programs, which were covertly funded with the money camouflaged in "X-budgets", worth up to an additional  the disclosed military budget.
By 1925, German companies had begun to design tanks and modern artillery. During the year, over half of Chinese arms imports were German and worth 13 million Reichsmarks. In January 1927, following the withdrawal of the Allied disarmament committee, Krupps ramped up production of armor plate and artillery.
 Production increased so that by 1937, military exports had increased to  Reichsmarks. Production was not the only violation: "Volunteers" were rapidly passed through the army to make a pool of trained reserves, and paramilitary organizations were encouraged with the illegally militarized police.

In December 1931, the  finalized a second rearmament plan that called for 480 million Reichsmarks to be spent over the following five years: this program sought to provide Germany the capability of creating and supplying a defensive force of 21 divisions supported by aircraft, artillery, and tanks. This coincided with a 1 billion Reichsmark programme that planned for additional industrial infrastructure that would be able to permanently maintain this force. As these programs did not require an expansion of the military, they were nominally legal.
On 7 November 1932, the Reich Minister of Defense Kurt von Schleicher authorized the illegal  Plan for a standing army of 21 divisions based on  soldiers and a large militia. Later in the year at the World Disarmament Conference, Germany withdrew to force France and Britain to accept German equality of status. London attempted to get Germany to return with the promise of all nations maintaining an equality in armaments and security. It was also negotiated for the French Army to be reduced.

In October 1933, following the rise of Adolf Hitler and the founding of the Nazi regime, Germany withdrew from the League of Nations and the World Disarmament Conference. In March 1935, Germany reintroduced conscription followed by an open rearmament programme and the official unveiling of the Luftwaffe (air force), and signed the Anglo-German Naval Agreement that allowed a surface fleet  the size of the Royal Navy. The resulting rearmament programmes were allotted 35 billion Reichsmarks over an eight-year period.

Territorial
On 7 March 1936, German troops entered and remilitarized the Rhineland.
On 12 March 1938, following German pressure to the collapse of the Austrian Government, German troops crossed into Austria and the following day Hitler announced the Anschluss: the annexation of Austria by Germany.
The following year, on 23 March 1939, Germany annexed Memel from Lithuania.

Historical assessments

Historians are split on the impact of the treaty. Some saw it as a good solution in a difficult time, others saw it as a disastrous measure that would anger the Germans to seek revenge. The actual impact of the treaty is also disputed.

In his book The Economic Consequences of the Peace, John Maynard Keynes referred to the Treaty of Versailles as a "Carthaginian peace", a misguided attempt to destroy Germany on behalf of French revanchism, rather than to follow the fairer principles for a lasting peace set out in President Woodrow Wilson's Fourteen Points, which Germany had accepted at the armistice. He stated: "I believe that the campaign for securing out of Germany the general costs of the war was one of the most serious acts of political unwisdom for which our statesmen have ever been responsible."
Keynes had been the principal representative of the British Treasury at the Paris Peace Conference, and used in his passionate book arguments that he and others (including some US officials) had used at Paris. He believed the sums being asked of Germany in reparations were many times more than it was possible for Germany to pay, and that these would produce drastic instability.

French economist Étienne Mantoux disputed that analysis. During the 1940s, Mantoux wrote a posthumously published book titled The Carthaginian Peace, or the Economic Consequences of Mr. Keynes in an attempt to rebut Keynes' claims. More recently economists have argued that the restriction of Germany to a small army saved it so much money it could afford the reparations payments.

It has been argued – for instance by historian Gerhard Weinberg in his book A World at Arms – that the treaty was in fact quite advantageous to Germany. The Bismarckian Reich was maintained as a political unit instead of being broken up, and Germany largely escaped post-war military occupation (in contrast to the situation following World War II). In a 1995 essay, Weinberg noted that with the disappearance of Austria-Hungary and with Russia withdrawn from Europe, that Germany was now the dominant power in Eastern Europe.

The British military historian Correlli Barnett claimed that the Treaty of Versailles was "extremely lenient in comparison with the peace terms that Germany herself, when she was expecting to win the war, had had in mind to impose on the Allies". Furthermore, he claimed, it was "hardly a slap on the wrist" when contrasted with the Treaty of Brest-Litovsk that Germany had imposed on a defeated Russian SFSR in March 1918, which had taken away a third of Russia's population (albeit mostly of non-Russian ethnicity), one-half of Russia's industrial undertakings and nine-tenths of Russia's coal mines, coupled with an indemnity of six billion marks. Eventually, even under the "cruel" terms of the Treaty of Versailles, Germany's economy had been restored to its pre-war status.

Barnett also claims that, in strategic terms, Germany was in fact in a superior position following the Treaty than she had been in 1914. Germany's eastern frontiers faced Russia and Austria, who had both in the past balanced German power. Barnett asserts that its post-war eastern borders were safer, because the former Austrian Empire fractured after the war into smaller, weaker states, Russia was wracked by revolution and civil war, and the newly restored Poland was no match for even a defeated Germany. In the West, Germany was balanced only by France and Belgium, both of which were smaller in population and less economically vibrant than Germany. Barnett concludes by saying that instead of weakening Germany, the treaty "much enhanced" German power.
Britain and France should have (according to Barnett) "divided and permanently weakened" Germany by undoing Bismarck's work and partitioning Germany into smaller, weaker states so it could never have disrupted the peace of Europe again.
By failing to do this and therefore not solving the problem of German power and restoring the equilibrium of Europe, Britain "had failed in her main purpose in taking part in the Great War".

The British historian of modern Germany, Richard J. Evans, wrote that during the war the German right was committed to an annexationist program which aimed at Germany annexing most of Europe and Africa. Consequently, any peace treaty that did not leave Germany as the conqueror would be unacceptable to them. Short of allowing Germany to keep all the conquests of the Treaty of Brest-Litovsk, Evans argued that there was nothing that could have been done to persuade the German right to accept Versailles. Evans further noted that the parties of the Weimar Coalition, namely the Social Democratic Party of Germany (SPD), the social liberal German Democratic Party (DDP) and the Christian democratic Centre Party, were all equally opposed to Versailles, and it is false to claim as some historians have that opposition to Versailles also equalled opposition to the Weimar Republic. Finally, Evans argued that it is untrue that Versailles caused the premature end of the Republic, instead contending that it was the Great Depression of the early 1930s that put an end to German democracy. He also argued that Versailles was not the "main cause" of National Socialism and the German economy was "only marginally influenced by the impact of reparations".

Ewa Thompson points out that the treaty allowed numerous nations in Central and Eastern Europe to liberate themselves from oppressive German rule, a fact that is often neglected by Western historiography, more interested in understanding the German point of view. In nations that found themselves free as the result of the treaty — such as Poles or Czechs — it is seen as a symbol of recognition of wrongs committed against small nations by their much larger aggressive neighbours.

Resentment caused by the treaty sowed fertile psychological ground for the eventual rise of the Nazi Party, but the German-born Australian historian Jürgen Tampke argued that it was "a perfidious distortion of history" to argue that the terms prevented the growth of democracy in Germany and aided the growth of the Nazi Party; saying that its terms were not as punitive as often held and that German hyper-inflation in the 1920s was partly a deliberate policy to minimise the cost of reparations. As an example of the arguments against the  he quotes Elizabeth Wiskemann who heard two officer's widows in Wiesbaden complaining that "with their stocks of linen depleted they had to have their linen washed once a fortnight (every two weeks) instead of once a month!"

The German historian Detlev Peukert wrote that Versailles was far from the impossible peace that most Germans claimed it was during the interwar period, and though not without flaws was actually quite reasonable to Germany. Rather, Peukert argued that it was widely believed in Germany that Versailles was a totally unreasonable treaty, and it was this "perception" rather than the "reality" of the Versailles treaty that mattered. Peukert noted that because of the "millenarian hopes" created in Germany during World War I when for a time it appeared that Germany was on the verge of conquering all of Europe, any peace treaty the Allies of World War I imposed on the defeated German Reich were bound to create a nationalist backlash, and there was nothing the Allies could have done to avoid that backlash. Having noted that much, Peukert commented that the policy of rapprochement with the Western powers that Gustav Stresemann carried out between 1923 and 1929 were constructive policies that might have allowed Germany to play a more positive role in Europe, and that it was not true that German democracy was doomed to die in 1919 because of Versailles. Finally, Peukert argued that it was the Great Depression and the turn to a nationalist policy of autarky within Germany at the same time that finished off the Weimar Republic, not the Treaty of Versailles.

French historian Raymond Cartier states that millions of ethnic Germans in the Sudetenland and in Posen-West Prussia were placed under foreign rule in a hostile environment, where harassment and violation of rights by authorities are documented.
Cartier asserts that, out of 1,058,000 Germans in Posen-West Prussia in 1921, 758,867 fled their homelands within five years due to Polish harassment. These sharpening ethnic conflicts would lead to public demands to reattach the annexed territory in 1938 and become a pretext for Hitler's annexations of Czechoslovakia and parts of Poland.

According to David Stevenson, since the opening of French archives, most commentators have remarked on French restraint and reasonableness at the conference, though Stevenson notes that "[t]he jury is still out", and that "there have been signs that the pendulum of judgement is swinging back the other way."

Territorial changes

The Treaty of Versailles resulted in the creation of several thousand miles of new boundaries, with maps playing a central role in the negotiations at Paris. The plebiscites initiated due to the treaty have drawn much comment. Historian Robert Peckham wrote that the issue of Schleswig "was premised on a gross simplification of the region's history. ... Versailles ignored any possibility of there being a third way: the kind of compact represented by the Swiss Federation; a bilingual or even trilingual Schleswig-Holsteinian state" or other options such as "a Schleswigian state in a loose confederation with Denmark or Germany, or an autonomous region under the protection of the League of Nations."
In regards to the East Prussia plebiscite, historian Richard Blanke wrote that "no other contested ethnic group has ever, under un-coerced conditions, issued so one-sided a statement of its national preference". Richard Debo wrote "both Berlin and Warsaw believed the Soviet invasion of Poland had influenced the East Prussian plebiscites. Poland appeared so close to collapse that even Polish voters had cast their ballots for Germany".

In regards to the Silesian plebiscite, Blanke observed "given that the electorate was at least 60% Polish-speaking, this means that about one 'Pole' in three voted for Germany" and "most Polish observers and historians" have concluded that the outcome of the plebiscite was due to "unfair German advantages of incumbency and socio-economic position". Blanke alleged "coercion of various kinds even in the face of an allied occupation regime" occurred, and that Germany granted votes to those "who had been born in Upper Silesia but no longer resided there". Blanke concluded that despite these protests "there is plenty of other evidence, including Reichstag election results both before and after 1921 and the large-scale emigration of Polish-speaking Upper Silesians to Germany after 1945, that their identification with Germany in 1921 was neither exceptional nor temporary" and "here was a large population of Germans and Poles—not coincidentally, of the same Catholic religion—that not only shared the same living space but also came in many cases to see themselves as members of the same national community". Prince Eustachy Sapieha, the Polish Minister of Foreign Affairs, alleged that Soviet Russia "appeared to be intentionally delaying negotiations" to end the Polish-Soviet War "with the object of influencing the Upper Silesian plebiscite". Once the region was partitioned, both "Germany and Poland attempted to 'cleanse' their shares of Upper Silesia" via oppression resulting in Germans migrating to Germany and Poles migrating to Poland. Despite the oppression and migration, Opole Silesia "remained ethnically mixed."

Frank Russell wrote that, in regards to the Saar plebiscite, the inhabitants "were not terrorized at the polls" and the "totalitarian [Nazi] German regime was not distasteful to most of the Saar inhabitants and that they preferred it even to an efficient, economical, and benevolent international rule." When the outcome of the vote became known, 4,100 (including 800 refugees who had previously fled Germany) residents fled over the border into France.

Military terms and violations
During the formulation of the treaty, the British wanted Germany to abolish conscription but be allowed to maintain a volunteer Army. The French wanted Germany to maintain a conscript army of up to 200,000 men in order to justify their own maintenance of a similar force. Thus the treaty's allowance of 100,000 volunteers was a compromise between the British and French positions. Germany, on the other hand, saw the terms as leaving them defenseless against any potential enemy.
Bernadotte Everly Schmitt wrote that "there is no reason to believe that the Allied governments were insincere when they stated at the beginning of Part V of the Treaty ... that in order to facilitate a general reduction of the armament of all nations, Germany was to be required to disarm first." A lack of American ratification of the treaty or joining the League of Nations left France unwilling to disarm, which resulted in a German desire to rearm. Schmitt argued "had the four Allies remained united, they could have forced Germany really to disarm, and the German will and capacity to resist other provisions of the treaty would have correspondingly diminished."

Max Hantke and Mark Spoerer wrote "military and economic historians [have] found that the German military only insignificantly exceeded the limits" of the treaty before 1933. Adam Tooze concurred, and wrote "To put this in perspective, annual military spending by the Weimar Republic was counted not in the billions but in the hundreds of millions of Reichsmarks"; for example, the Weimar Republic's 1931 program of 480 million Reichsmarks over five years compared to the Nazi Government's 1933 plan to spend 4.4 billion Reichsmarks per year.
P. M. H. Bell argued that the British Government was aware of later Weimar rearming, and lent public respectability to the German efforts by not opposing them, an opinion shared by Churchill.
Norman Davies wrote that "a curious oversight" of the military restrictions were that they "did not include rockets in its list of prohibited weapons", which provided Wernher von Braun an area to research within eventually resulting in "his break [that] came in 1943" leading to the development of the V-2 rocket.

Rise of the Nazis 
The Treaty created much resentment in Germany, which was exploited by Adolf Hitler in his rise to power at the helm of Nazi Germany. Central to this was belief in the stab-in-the-back myth, which held that the German army had not lost the war and had been betrayed by the Weimar Republic, who negotiated an unnecessary surrender. The Great Depression exacerbated the issue and led to a collapse of the German economy. Though the treaty may not have caused the crash, it was a convenient scapegoat. Germans viewed the treaty as a humiliation and eagerly listened to Hitler's oratory which blamed the treaty for Germany's ills. Hitler promised to reverse the depredations of the Allied powers and recover Germany's lost territory and pride, which has led to the treaty being cited as a cause of World War II.

See also

 Aftermath of World War I
 Little Treaty of Versailles
 Minority Treaties
 Septemberprogramm

Notes

Footnotes

Citations

Sources

{{Cite book| title = Verhandlung der verfassungsgebenden Nationalversammlung: Stenographische Berichte und Drucksachen | publisher = German National Assembly
 | year = 1919
 | volume = 24 | pages = 631–635
 | ref = 
}}

Further reading

 Published in the US as Memoirs of the Peace Conference Also published as 

Historiography and memory

External links

 Documents relating to the Treaty from the Parliamentary Collections
 Treaty of Versailles Resource Guide from the Library of Congress
 Photographs of the document
 The consequences of the Treaty of Versailles for today's world
 Text of Protest by Germany and Acceptance of Fair Peace Treaty
 My 1919 – A film from the Chinese point of view, the only country that did not sign the treaty
 "Versailles Revisted" (Review of Manfred Boemeke, Gerald Feldman and Elisabeth Glaser, The Treaty of Versailles: A Reassessment after 75 Years. Cambridge, UK: German Historical Institute, Washington, and Cambridge University Press, 1998), Strategic Studies'' 9:2 (Spring 2000), 191–205
 Map of Europe and the impact of the Versailles Treaty  at omniatlas.com

 
1919 in France
June 1919 events
Arms control treaties
Articles containing video clips
France–Germany relations
Germany–Italy relations
Germany–Japan relations
Germany–United Kingdom relations
Germany–United States relations
International relations
Treaty
Peace treaties of France
Peace treaties of Germany
Peace treaties of Italy
Peace treaties of Japan
Peace treaties of the United Kingdom
Peace treaties of the United States
Treaties concluded in 1919
Treaties entered into force in 1920
Treaties of the Empire of Japan
Treaties of the French Third Republic
Treaties of the German Empire
Treaties of the Kingdom of Italy (1861–1946)
Treaties of the United Kingdom (1801–1922)
World War I treaties